Antonio Fanelli (born 29 May 1966) is an Italian former professional road cyclist. His brother Ivan also competed as a professional cyclist.

Major results
1984
 1st  Road race, National Junior Road Championships
1986
 1st  Road race, National Amateur Road Championships
 1st Trofeo Salvatore Morucci
 2nd Giro del Casentino
1987
 4th Gran Premio della Liberazione
1989
 2nd Coppa Sabatini
 5th GP Industria & Artigianato
1990
 3rd Giro dell'Appennino
 3rd Giro di Campania
1991
 3rd Giro di Romagna
1993
 1st  National Motor-paced Championships
1995
 3rd  UCI Motor-paced World Championships
 5th GP Industria & Artigianato

References

External links

1966 births
Living people
Italian male cyclists
Sportspeople from Bari
Italian track cyclists
Cyclists from Apulia